Striking Distance is a 1993 American action thriller film starring Bruce Willis as Pittsburgh Police homicide detective Thomas Hardy. The film co-stars Sarah Jessica Parker, Dennis Farina, and Tom Sizemore. It was directed by Rowdy Herrington and written by Herrington and Marty Kaplan.  The film was shot on location throughout Pittsburgh; its early title was Three Rivers.

Plot 
Pittsburgh homicide detective Thomas Hardy turns in his partner and cousin, Jimmy Detillo, for using excessive force, which in turn causes him to become alienated by the majority of his fellow officers. Thomas and his father, Vincent, are en route to the Policemen's Ball when a call comes in indicating a serial killer, the Polish Hill Strangler, who Tommy believes is a police officer, has been spotted driving in downtown Pittsburgh. As Tom and Vince pursue the killer's car, the vehicles collide and both roll down an embankment. When Tom regains consciousness, he learns his father has been shot dead and the killer has escaped. Police arrest a criminal named Douglas Kesser as the Strangler. Later, Jimmy jumps off the 31st Street Bridge; his body is never found.

Two years later, an alcoholic Tom has been reassigned to the River Rescue Squad. Called to the scene of a body dump, Tom finds the victim is an ex-girlfriend. He is assigned a new partner, Jo Christman, who learns from District Attorney Frank Morris that Tom had been demoted after telling a television reporter that he believed the Strangler was a policeman. After a nurse is abducted, Tom receives a phone call similar to the ones left by the Strangler. Detective Eddie Eiler, who hates Tom for turning in Jimmy, states on TV the murder was committed by a copycat. Tom is met with strong opposition by his uncle, Captain Nick Detillo, after suggesting the Strangler is back. Tom steals the Strangler file from the precinct in order to conduct an unauthorized investigation into the murders. Soon after, the body of another of Tom's ex-girlfriends is found.

Tom is invited to the Policemen's Ball by Jo, as she is not familiar with any other officers and is developing romantic feelings for him. A tussle occurs there between Tom and the hostile officers in attendance, but Jo intervenes and takes him home. Later that same night, the two engage in a heated confrontation after Jo pours Tom's whiskey down the sink in an attempt to prevent him from drinking. Tom pleads for her to leave, but is shocked when Jo refuses and declares that she will spend the night. Though initially hesitant, Tom eventually succumbs to Jo and they have sex. At one point during the lovemaking, Jo gazes at Tom in amazement as he lies on top of her, both unaware that they are being watched by someone outdoors.

The next morning, Tom arrives to river patrol a new man, staring adoringly at Jo as she directs their routes. His happiness is short-lived however, when they stumble upon someone dumping what appears to be a wrapped body off a bridge. Tom destroys the suspect's car with a flare gun, but the unidentified individual escapes on foot. Divers retrieve the bundle only to find it to be merely a group of rugs, which leads to Tom and Jo being humiliated by their peers. Later that night in bed, the lovers share their suspicions that the killer purposely dumped the rugs in the river to discredit them. As their discussion moves towards the future, Jo confesses to Tom that she was previously married and now has a four-year-old daughter. This news doesn't cause Tom to think any differently of their relationship, and they make love again. 
   
Meanwhile, Eiler informs Nick he suspects Tom of the murders. Nick discloses that Tom has been under scrutiny by Internal Affairs. During a court hearing to have Tom removed from the force, it is revealed that Jo's real name is Emily Harper, a Pennsylvania State Police investigator probing Tom for evidence of misconduct. Emily perjures herself and Tom goes free.

Emily is kidnapped from her apartment just as Tom finds the body of another victim (this time a coworker from River Rescue) outside his houseboat. Thinking that Jimmy's brother Danny has been committing the murders out of revenge, Tom heads upriver to the Detillo family cabin. Just as Danny arrives, someone from behind tases Tom unconscious. Tom awakens to find himself, Danny, and Emily handcuffed to chairs. The killer turns out to be none other than Jimmy, who survived the fall into the river. Jimmy is about to kill Emily when Nick suddenly walks in and tells his son to turn himself in. Jimmy instead forces Nick to reveal that Nick arrived at the crash site and confronted the killer and was horrified to find it was Jimmy. Jimmy begged Nick to let him go, which he did. Vince pried himself out of the wreckage and took aim at the fleeing killer, unaware that it was Jimmy. Nick tried to stop him and, in the ensuing struggle, accidentally shot and killed Vince. 

Jimmy shoots Nick and fights with Danny, giving Tom a chance to free himself. As the police close in, Jimmy flees in Tom's motorboat with Tom in pursuit. The two get into a battle in which the pair fall into the Ohio river and Tom kills Jimmy by tasering him in the mouth. The final scene shows Tom, who has been reinstated as a detective, visiting and putting a wreath on his father's grave with Emily and her daughter Sarah.

Cast 
 Bruce Willis as Sergeant Tommy Hardy, a former homicide detective who was partnered with his cousin whom he later testified against. He is now an officer with the city's River Rescue Squad.
 Sarah Jessica Parker as  PSP Detective Trooper Emily Harper / Officer Jo Christman
 Dennis Farina as Captain Nick Detillo, Tommy's uncle and Danny and Jimmy's father.
 Tom Sizemore as Danny Detillo, Tommy's cousin, Jimmy's brother and Nick's son. Formerly a Pittsburgh Police Officer as well. He leaves the force and becomes an alcoholic.
 Brion James as Detective Eddie Eiler, a loud, rude overzealous detective who despises Tommy for ratting on his partner.
 Robert Pastorelli as Jimmy Detillo, Tommy's disgraced cousin and partner.
 Timothy Busfield as Officer Sacco, a by-the-book, but sarcastic officer, who was Tommy’s first partner in the River Rescue Squad.
 John Mahoney as Captain Vince Hardy, Tom's father.
 Andre Braugher as District Attorney Frank Morris
 Tom Atkins as Sergeant Fred Hardy, a police officer and Tommy's uncle.
 Mike Hodge as Captain Penderman, Tommy's commanding officer on the River Rescue Squad.
 Jodi Long as Kim Lee, a dispatcher of the River Rescue Squad.
 Roscoe Orman as Sid
 Robert Gould as Douglas Kesser
 Gareth Williams as Chick Chicanis
 Billy Hartung as Boat Preppie
 Timothy Butts as Huck Tuckerman

Production 
The film was cited as one of the many troubled projects during the time Sony Pictures was run by Jon Peters and Peter Guber. It took a huge amount of resources to merely break even.

Filming took 13 weeks in the summer of 1992 in Pittsburgh. The working title was Three Rivers, and it was scheduled for release on May 21, 1993. But after the original performed poorly with test audiences, extensive reshoots were done in Los Angeles, with story changes and removal of some plot points. Because of this, the release date was pushed from May to Sept. 17.
According to articles and reports at the time, test audiences were unimpressed with the initial cut of the film largely allegedly because they found parts of it confusing. Those parts were added into director Rowdy Herrington's and Marty Kaplan's original script by star Willis. One source claimed the original cut was like "Hudson Hawk without the laughs."

One of the veteran production members said that Willis "called the shots like he did on '(Hudson) Hawk' and like he used to do on 'Moonlighting'. He had scenes rewritten. He did what he wanted to do. We were working with Orson Willis."

When news about reshoots were reported, Columbia's then-current chairman Mark Canton said in an interview that he "couldn't be more enthusiastic" about the film, predicting it would be a "beyond-sizable hit". But in order to do so, the movie had to make $30 million-plus profit at the box office. Canton was known for being heavily involved in several other films in earlier years that had very troubled productions and received negative receptions from audiences during test screenings. Those include Wes Craven's sci-fi horror film Deadly Friend, one of Willis's earlier box office flops The Bonfire of the Vanities, and John McTiernan's Last Action Hero. Just as he did with Striking Distance, Canton kept the news and rumors about problems on sets of those films and negative responses from test audiences from the public and demanded heavy changes on the films, which only ended up making matters worse.

In Striking Distances case, for example, all the love/intimate scenes between Hardy and Jo were re-shot to make them sexier. Several dialogue scenes, such as the scene in the bar between Willis and Sizemore, were also cut to make the film's pace quicker. The change in tone made Columbia change the title from Three Rivers to Striking Distance, as it now focused more on the action/thriller elements. Although his interference in the script and huge ego during filming caused problems with the production and the original cut, Willis was still very angry because he had to return for re-shoots, so much so that he blamed Herrington for it, despite the fact that Herrington defended Willis in interviews regarding problems with the film. According to cast and crew, Willis treated Herrington very poorly during both initial filming and re-shoots.

The theatrical trailer shows a lot of deleted, extended and alternate scenes, probably ones that were cut or changed when the original cut wasn’t well received by test audiences. There are also many promotional stills that show several other deleted scenes, such as Tom and Jo pulling a man out of the water while a group of people watch them and a deleted shot from the ending, showing Tom kneeling over Nick's body.

Reception

Box office
Striking Distance opened at number one at the US box office with a gross of $8,705,808 but only went on to gross a total of $24 million. Internationally it did better, including a number one opening in France, grossing $53 million for a worldwide total of $77 million on a budget of $30 million.

Critical response
On Rotten Tomatoes the film has an approval rating of 17% based on 24 reviews. The site's consensus states: "Weighed down by a rote story and passionless performances, Striking Distance represents one of the lesser '90s genre outings from action hero Bruce Willis." On Metacritic it has a score of 36% based on reviews from 25 critics, indicating "generally unfavorable reviews". Audiences polled by CinemaScore gave the film an average grade of "B" on an A+ to F scale.

Roger Ebert rated the film one and a half out of four stars, criticizing the film's cliches (even listing them individually) and stating: "The credits say "written by Rowdy Herrington and Martin Kaplan," but the right word would have been "anthologized."" Owen Gleiberman called the film a "flat, dankly lit, grindingly inept thriller about a serial killer whose victims all turn out to have been acquaintances of Willis' rumpled, alcoholic cop hero."

References

External links 
 
 
 
 

1993 films
1993 action thriller films
1990s English-language films
1990s chase films
1990s police films
1990s serial killer films
American action thriller films
American chase films
American police detective films
American serial killer films
Columbia Pictures films
Fictional portrayals of the Pittsburgh Bureau of Police
Films directed by Rowdy Herrington
Films scored by Brad Fiedel
Films set in 1991
Films set in 1993
Films set in Pittsburgh
Films shot in Los Angeles
Films shot in Pittsburgh
Fratricide in fiction
Patricide in fiction
Films produced by Arnon Milchan
1990s American films